Botello is a surname. Notable people with the surname include:

Ángel Botello (1913–1986), Spanish-Puerto Rican painter
Feliciano de la Mota Botello (1769–1830), Argentine politician
Javier Botello, Spanish swimmer
Jose Botello (born 1976), American soccer player
José Alfredo Botello (born 1956), Mexican politician
Kate Botello, American television personality
Narciso Botello, American politician